Rob Parker (January 18, 1943 – March 17, 2016) was a Progressive Conservative party member of the House of Commons of Canada. He was a broadcaster, businessman and journalist by career.

He was elected to the 30th Canadian Parliament at the Eglinton riding in a by-election on 16 October 1978. In the 1979 election, Parker was defeated at the Eglinton—Lawrence riding by Roland de Corneille of the Liberal party. He made another unsuccessful attempt to unseat de Corneille there in the 1980 election.

In 2007, Parker was living in the Lake Chapala region of Mexico, active with the Canadian expatriate community there.

Electoral record

References

External links
 

1943 births
2016 deaths
Canadian journalists
Members of the House of Commons of Canada from Ontario
Progressive Conservative Party of Canada MPs
People from Ajijic